Hindu Temple of Ottawa-Carleton is a significant Hindu temple in the Gloucester section of Ottawa.

For the first time, a Hindu temple in Eastern Ontario in 1985. The temple is located on Bank Street in the rural area to the south of urban Ottawa, south-east of the airport. The site, previously a cornfield, was purchased for the temple in 1984. The $4 million structure, funded by donations made by Canadian Hindus, was officially opened in 1989. It serves the estimated 6,000 Hindus who live in Ottawa, as well as acting as a community and cultural centre for the community with halls, libraries, and other resources. The temple follows traditional Hindu architectural styles, though compromises had to be made to adapt to the cold and weight of snow accumulation. The temple has nine shrines: Ganesha, Kartikeya, Krishna with Radha, Shiva, Lakshmi with Narayana, Rama with Sita and Lakshmana with Hanuman, Durga, Hanuman, and Nataraja.

The effort to build the temple was by Pandit Madhu Sahasrabudhe, a food science researcher who had also served as a priest in the city since 1960.  Until his death in 2004 Sahasrabudhe also played an essential role in the community. He is the chair of the Capital Region Interfaith Council. In 2002, he led prayers at a multi-faith thanksgiving event with the Queen in attendance. He frequently appeared as part of the Ottawa Citizen'''s panel of local religious leaders.

Main deities at the Temple

Sri Ganesh
Lord Subrahmanya
Sri Krishna and Radha
Lord Shiva
Sri Lakshmi Narayan
Sri Durga
Sri Ram Parivar
Sri Hanuman
Sri Nataraja
Nava Graha

Major festivals celebrated

Navratri
Diwali
Maha Shivratri
Lohri
Makar Sankranti/Pongal/Uttarayana
Holi
Sri Rama Navami/Sri Sita Rama Kalyanam
Tulsi Vivah
Karva Chauth
Janmashtami

See also

 World Hinduism
 Hinduism by country
 Hindu calendar
 List of Hindu temples
 Hindu deities
 List of Hindu deities
 List of Hinduism-related articles
 History of India
 Hindu scriptures

References
"Area's first Hindu temple under construction on Hwy. 31." Lesly Bauer The Ottawa Citizen. Nov 22, 1985. pg. C.25
"Finding serenity in a field of corn: It was a 'holy day' in 1989 when, amid farms and pastures, the Hindu Temple of Ottawa-Carleton opened its door for the first time." Ron Corbett. The Ottawa Citizen. May 16, 2002. pg. B.3
"Ottawa man blazed trail for other Hindus." Bob Harvey. The Ottawa Citizen''. Jul 31, 2004. pg. E.10

External links
 

Hindu temples in Canada
Buildings and structures in Ottawa